The following radio stations broadcast on AM frequency 1070 kHz: The Federal Communications Commission classifies 1070 AM as a United States and Canadian clear-channel frequency.  KNX in Los Angeles and CBA in Moncton, New Brunswick shared Class A status on this frequency. But on April 7, 2008, CBA moved to the FM dial.

In Argentina 
 LR1 El Mundo in Buenos Aires

In Canada

In Mexico 
  in Acapulco, Guerrero
  in Tehuacán, Puebla
  in Cd. del Carmen, Campeche

In the United States 
Stations in bold are clear-channel stations.

References

Lists of radio stations by frequency